Monsters of Myth & Legend is a supplement for fantasy role-playing games published by Mayfair Games in 1984.

Contents
Monsters of Myth & Legend is a supplement describing over 100 monsters drawn from the American Indian, Australian Aborigine, Chinese, Greek, Irish Celtic, and Norse mythoi.  Each includes game statistics and legendry; most are illustrated.

Monsters of Myth & Legend is a sourcebook play aid containing encyclopedic listings of dozens of creatures and deities to add to an existing fantasy campaign or to help designers in coming up with their own adventures.  Norse and Greek mythologies are covered, along with the legends of Ireland, China, the Australian Aborigines, and the American Indians.  Each entry includes physical descriptions, backgrounds, game statistics and hints on play.  Also included as a thorough index, four pages of GM tables, and a bibliography of sources.

Publication history
Monsters of Myth & Legend was written by Greg Gorden and Neil Randall, with a cover by Boris Vallejo, and was published by Mayfair Games in 1984 as a 96-page book.

Reception
Rick Swan reviewed Monsters of Myth & Legend in The Space Gamer No. 75. He commented that "Regardless of whether you actually ever use this material in a roleplaying campaign, much of it makes for fascinating reading, particularly if you're as unfamiliar as I was with the mythologies of the Aborigines or the Irish. [...] even a casual browse through the book should give a GM plenty of new ideas.  All necessary statistics are given, and even though they're biased towards Dungeons & Dragons, they're easy to adapt to other systems." He added: "With all of the care that went into the book, I'm surprised at the generally haphazard quality of the illustrations. Aside from the striking cover painting, most of the artwork is hit or miss, ranging from adequate to downright embarrassing – some of it looks like a junior-high artist's idea of 'scary.'  The high quality of the text makes the amateurish visuals even more annoying, especially considering that a good illustration is a lot more effective than a column of written description in a sourcebook of this kind." Swan concluded the review by saying, "Although roleplaying sourcebooks are invaluable for game designers, I'm not completely sold on their usefulness for your average player (or even your average GM).  But if you go for this kind of thing, you'll have to look long and hard to find a more interesting one than Monsters of Myth & Legend.  It's a good package, fun to read, and guaranteed to have a lot of information you've never seen anywhere else."

References

Fantasy role-playing game supplements
Role Aids
Role-playing game supplements introduced in 1984